Anthony Mitchell (born 27 May 1989, in Brisbane, Queensland) is an Australian former professional rugby league footballer who played for the North Queensland Cowboys, Sydney Roosters and Parramatta Eels. An Indigenous All Stars representative , he played in the National Rugby League for Parramatta Eels, Sydney Roosters and North Queensland Cowboys.

Early career
Born in Brisbane, Mitchell was spent his early childhood in Brisbane. At the age of five, Mitchell's parents separated and the family moved to Townsville, there he and his brother were raised by their father, Steve, and their grandmother, Margaret. In Townsville, Mitchell began playing rugby league for Townsville Brothers and attended the well known rugby league high school Ignatius Park College. He was selected for the Australian Institute of Sport under 18's tour of France and England in 2006 and represented the Queensland under 19 side in 2007. He joined the Parramatta Eels junior system at age 17 and starred for them in the inaugural National Youth Competition in 2008, playing in all 26 of the Eels matches that season.

In 2009 Mitchell played just 12 matches of the Toyota Cup, due to injuries. During this season Mitchell was moved between Hooker, Lock, Interchange and Five-eighth, he captained the Eels for two games that season.

Parramatta Eels
After spending the majority of the season playing for the Eels feeder team, the Wentworthville Magpies, Mitchell was called up to play first grade near the end of the 2010 season. He made his debut for the Eels against the Brisbane Broncos, scoring a try in the win. He would play two more games that year for the Eels. Despite only three NRL games under his belt, Mitchell was selected to play for the Indigenous All Stars after Preston Campbell was forced to withdraw due to injury.

Sydney Roosters
In 2011, after just seven games for the Eels (four in 2011), Mitchell signed with the Roosters mid-season. He played 10 games for the club that season. In 2012, Mitchell was again called up to the Indigenous All Stars. Mitchell impressed with little game time during his 12 months at the Roosters, Mitchell played almost 20 games for the club and was 'highly rated' amongst Rooster fans.

North Queensland Cowboys
In June 2012, after playing seventeen games for the Roosters (7 in 2012), Mitchell made his second mid-season switch in two years, signing with his home town team, the North Queensland Cowboys. Mitchell was released from the Roosters on 25 June, just five days before the 30 June deadline. He arrived in Townsville the following day and completed his first training session with the team. Mitchell lined up against the New Zealand Warriors that week wearing the number 19 jersey, he was a late inclusion for the dropped Cory Paterson, Mitchell played 60 minutes and impressed the coaching staff, earning an interchange bench spot against the Melbourne Storm a week a later.

Mitchell said that playing for the Cowboys was a dream come true for him and that he had no regrets leaving the Roosters during the mid-season. Mitchell scored his first try for the club in the Cowboys 29-16 win against the Wests Tigers in Round 19 of the 2012 season. He has been in career best form since signing with the club. He was contracted with the Cowboys until the end of the 2013 season.

In Round 25 of the 2012 season, Mitchell was a match-day replacement for injured halfback Michael Morgan, played a role in all three of the Cowboys' tries as they held out an onslaught by the Knights late in the first half to move, the Cowboys won the match 22-14.

Townsville Blackhawks
Mitchell left the Cowboys when his contract expired at the end of the 2014 season and joined the newly formed Townsville Blackhawks in the Queensland Cup.

After three seasons with the Blackhawks, including one as captain, Mitchell retired from rugby league at the end of 2017. He finished his career as the Blackhawks' most capped player.

References

External links
Parramatta Eels profile

1989 births
Living people
Australian rugby league players
Indigenous Australian rugby league players
North Queensland Cowboys players
Sydney Roosters players
Parramatta Eels players
Indigenous All Stars players
Mackay Cutters players
Wentworthville Magpies players
Newtown Jets NSW Cup players
Junior Kangaroos players
Rugby league hookers
Rugby league halfbacks
Townsville Blackhawks players
Rugby league players from Brisbane